Michael Parks (born February 15, 1992) is an American professional ice hockey player who currently plays for HKm Zvolen of the Slovak Extraliga (Slovak).

Career
Parks was drafted in the fifth round of the 2010 NHL Entry Draft by the Philadelphia Flyers. After four seasons at the University of North Dakota, he started his career with the Lehigh Valley Phantoms of the American Hockey League (AHL) in 2015 and the Quad City Mallards of the ECHL in 2016.

Parks signed a contract in Finland to play for top flight Liiga team, Vaasan Sport on July 26, 2017. Late in the 2017–18 season, Parks joined Timrå IK in the Swedish Allsvenskan.

In the 2018–19 season, Parks continued his career in Europe agreeing to a one-year contract with Austrian club, Dornbirn Bulldogs on July 9, 2018. As a regular among the Bulldogs top-nine forwards, Parks added 10 goals and 22 points through 44 regular-season games.

As a free agent, Parks opted to return to North America and the ECHL after two seasons abroad, agreeing to a one-year deal with home state team, the Kansas City Mavericks on July 31, 2019.

Career statistics

References

External links

1992 births
Living people
American men's ice hockey right wingers
Cedar Rapids RoughRiders players
Dornbirn Bulldogs players
HKM Zvolen players
Ice hockey people from St. Louis
Kansas City Mavericks players
Lehigh Valley Phantoms players
North Dakota Fighting Hawks men's ice hockey players
Philadelphia Flyers draft picks
Quad City Mallards (ECHL) players
Timrå IK players
Vaasan Sport players
American expatriate ice hockey players in Finland
American expatriate ice hockey players in Slovakia
American expatriate ice hockey players in Sweden
American expatriate ice hockey players in Austria